The 158th Infantry Regiment ("Bushmasters") is an infantry unit of the Arizona National Guard.  The regiment has served abroad in World War I, World War II and Afghanistan.

In 1967 then Governor of Arizona Jack Williams signed into law that 3 December would be "Bushmaster Day" in the State of Arizona in honor of the regiment's service.

History
The 159th Infantry takes its lineage directly from the 1st Arizona Volunteer Infantry which was formed in late 1865 and disbanded in late 1866. The unit participated in a number of campaigns against the Apache during the Apache Wars and comprised companies of Maricopa and Pima American Indians.

During the Spanish–American War the unit morphed to another unit and formed the additional element known as the Arizona 1st Volunteer Cavalry. They soon adopted as the motto "Cuidado" a Spanish word meaning "take care" in reference to when they would patrol for them to be on guard. However, later the term would be applied far more liberally when the 158th was conducting jungle warfare training in Panama and the deadly pit viper from which they drew their nickname infested the jungle, from here Bushmasters would tell each other to beware of the snake. In 1916, during the Pancho Villa Expedition, an expeditionary force led by General John Pershing into Mexico, the 1st Arizona Volunteer Infantry guarded and patrolled the border between Douglas and Naco, Arizona until World War I was declared on 6 April 1917.

World War I
The 1st Arizona Infantry was drafted into federal service 5 August 1917 and re-designated as the 158th Infantry Regiment as part of the 79th Brigade, of the 40th Division.  The division was sent overseas to France in August 1918.  The regiment saw no active service at the front, however, its men furnished replacement personnel to other units. The regiment acted as the guard of honor to President Woodrow Wilson during his visit to France in 1918, and the regimental band marched and performed in the Allied Victory Parade which he attended. The regiment arrived at the port of New York on the USS Ohioan, was relieved from assignment to the 40th Division on 20 April 1919, and was demobilized on 3 May 1919 at Camp Kearny, California.

Interwar period

The 158th Infantry was reconstituted in the National Guard in 1921, assigned to the 45th Division, and allotted to the state of Arizona. The regiment was reorganized from 1922 to 1924, with the headquarters organized and federally recognized at Phoenix, Arizona, on 12 September 1924. The headquarters was relocated on 11 October 1932 to Tucson, Arizona. In 1924, F Company was formed as an all-native American unit made up of alumni of the Phoenix Indian School.

World War II
At the outbreak of World War II, the unit was ordered into Federal service on 16 September 1940 and started training at Fort Sill, Oklahoma.  The regiment then moved to Camp Barkeley, Texas in February 1941 and conducted maneuvers in Louisiana.  After the United States declared war on 8 December 1941, the unit was detached from the 45th Division and was sent to Panama to reinforce the defenses of the Panama Canal Zone arriving 2 January 1942.  The regiment was relieved of assignment to the 45th on 11 February 1942 and became a separate infantry regiment.  This was done as the "square" divisions of the US Army were reorganized as triangular divisions.  The US Army operated a number of separate infantry regiments during the war.  Of these, approximately 29 separate regiments, including the 158th participated in overseas campaigns.

The 158th was assigned to the Panama Mobile Force where it joined a veteran jungle unit, the 14th Infantry "Jungleers," and the 5th Infantry in conducting security operations in the Panama Canal Zone. During this time the men of the 158th built training facilities and conducted numerous patrols in the dense Panamanian jungle.  Their main tool for hacking out jungle trails was the machete. The thick jungle concealed many hazardous plants, insects, and animals, including the highly venomous snake known as the Bushmaster. The 158th subsequently adopted the nickname "Bushmasters" and created a shoulder sleeve insignia which showed a Bushmaster snake wrapped around the blade of a machete. Encounters with deadly snakes were common, lending new significance to the regiment's Spanish motto "Cuidado" (Take Care) which originated with the 1st Arizona Volunteer Infantry.

In 1942, the 158th was one of four infantry regiments of the Panama Mobile Force chosen to create and train a jungle platoon which was used to test specialized jungle equipment, weapons, tactics, and rations. The success of these platoons led the Caribbean Defense Command to order "training in jungle warfare tactics for all echelons of this command will be placed in high priority." Undoubtedly, the bulk of the 158th also gained considerable jungle experience during the course of the regiment's routine operations. In November 1942 the Bushmasters were ordered to prepare for transfer to Australia as part of the buildup of General Walter Krueger's 6th Army.  As a result, the regiment did not have sufficient time to conduct comprehensive jungle warfare training for all echelons before its embarkation in early January 1943.

The Bushmasters arrived at Brisbane, Australia in late January 1943. In mid-March the regiment received orders to move in echelons to Port Moresby, New Guinea. The entire regiment was assembled there by the end of the month. From there it moved to Milne Bay in late May. In the early morning hours of 24 June the first elements of the 158th Regiment, less 2nd Battalion, began landing on the unoccupied island of Kiriwina, New Guinea as part of Operation Chronicle. This unit was to act as a shore party in unloading equipment and supplied. The purpose of the operation was to occupy the island and construct an airfield for planned operations on New Britain.  The bulk of the regiment's two battalions arrived at dawn on 30 June. In mid-July, the 2nd Battalion, which since 20 June had been providing security for 6th Army Headquarters at Milne Bay, was ordered to Goodenough Island, New Guinea as a security force. On 21 October General Kruger moved his 6th Army Headquarters to Goodenough Island, where the 2nd Battalion resumed its security duties for that headquarters. The regiment was spread out between Kiriwina, Woodlark and Goodenough Islands in New Guinea.

Company G, 158th Regiment embarked for Arawe, New Britain on 15 December, as part of Operation Director and was soon joined by the remainder of the 2nd Battalion and began combat duties in the Arawe area. After being relieved at Arawe, the 2nd Battalion sailed to Finschhafen, where they rejoined the 1st and 3rd Battalions who had been on garrison duty on Woodlark and Kiriwina islands. At Finschhafen, the 158th Regiment was redesignated the 158th Regimental Combat Team.

By order of Alamo Force Headquarters the 158th RCT was sent to Toem, Netherlands New Guinea to join Task Force Tornado which included the 163rd Regimental Combat Team, 41st Division.  The combat team arrived at Toem on 21 May 1944 and began relieving elements of the 163rd RCT at the Tor River two days later. The regimental combat team was ordered to capture a Japanese airfield to the North West at Sarmi.  The area was defended by strong elements of the Imperial Japanese 36th Division.  For several days the two units fought a series of vicious engagements on and around an important intermediate objective known by the Americans as Lone Tree Hill.  These engagements represented the opening blows of the Battle of Lone Tree Hill.  The 158th RCT was relieved on 14 June by the 20th Regiment, 6th Infantry Division so it could prepare for a pending operation. The 6th Infantry Division relieved the rest of Task Force Tornado and resumed the effort to take Lone Tree Hill and capture the Japanese airfield at Sarmi. "During its operations in the Wakde-Sarmi area the 158th RCT lost 70 men killed, 257 wounded, and 4 missing.  The unit took 11 Japanese prisoners and estimated that it killed 920 of the enemy.

On 2 July, the regimental combat team went ashore as part of the Battle of Noemfoor on Noemfoor Island, Netherlands New Guinea, to capture the airfields and to provide security for the engineers upgrading the airfields to operational use. As part of General Douglas MacArthur's return to the Philippines, the regimental combat team under the command of the much respected and admired General Hanford MacNider landed at Lingayen Gulf, Luzon as part of the invasion of Lingayen Gulf on 11 January 1945 and suffered heavy casualties from well dug in Japanese forces along the Damortis-Rosario road. In heavy fighting on 1–2 February Company G, captured two 30 cm Japanese Howitzers which were directing heavy fire on American ground forces and killed 164 enemy soldiers.  For this action Company G was awarded the Presidential Unit Citation. The entire regiment would be awarded the Philippine Presidential Unit Citation for its fighting in the Philippines.

The next objective tasked to the regimental combat team was Batangas, Luzon where they cleared the area around Balayan Bay and Batangas Bay, which took three weeks to subdue. Then on 1 April, the regimental combat team invaded the Bicol Peninsula, landing at Legaspi. F Company was made up most of Native Americans from the main tribes of the Salt River Valley, but was led by white officers. Many of these officers, who survived combat, later recounted participating in Native American rituals; such as becoming blood brothers and purifying their warrior's spirit before battle. Although these rituals are not today performed by the majority of the unit's soldiers, they still use Japanese saki to toast with in reference to the supply captured by the regiment during its time in the Philippines. After being relieved in Philippines campaign, the regiment was selected as part of the planned Operation Downfall, the invasion of Japan, the Bushmasters were chosen to attack the island of Tanegashima to capture the island's air warning stations two days prior to the Allied assault on Kyūshū. Japan surrendered after the Soviets took north China in two weeks, and also the atomic bombing of Hiroshima and Nagasaki. On 13 October 1945, the regimental combat team landed in Yokohama, Japan to be part of the Occupation of Japan. The 158th Regimental Combat Team was inactivated at Utsunomiya, Japan, on 17 January 1946.

General MacArthur gave the Bushmasters the accolade, "No greater fighting combat team has ever deployed for battle".

1948 to today
The regiment was reactivated on 21 January 1948 at Glendale, Arizona. Later reorganized and redesignated as the Heavy Mortar Company, 158th Infantry, and then Combat Support Company, 1st Battle Group, 158th Infantry. The unit was then reorganized and redesignated as Headquarters and Headquarters Company, 3rd Battalion, 158th Infantry, 258th Infantry Brigade on 1 March 1963 and again on 10 December 1967 to Headquarters and Headquarters Company, 1583rd Military Police Battalion, 258th Military Police Brigade. It was again redesignated on 1 September 1969 as Headquarters and Headquarters Company, 157th Military Police Battalion. In 1967 however despite protest from veterans and soldiers, the last remnants of the 158th Infantry were disbanded and their colors retired.

In 2005, the 1st Battalion, 180th Artillery Regiment, 153rd Field Artillery Brigade, was deactivated and redesignated the 1st Battalion, 158th Infantry Regiment, 29th Infantry Brigade with five companies: Headquarters and Headquarters Company in Mesa (since moved to Phoenix); Company A in Tucson, Company B in Gilbert (since moved to Florence); Company C in Prescott; and Company D in Yuma (since moved to Buckeye). In January 2007, 1st Battalion, 158th Infantry Regiment was mobilized and deployed to Afghanistan in April of that year. During that time the battalion was posted to the southeastern area of the country near the border of Pakistan in the Hindu Kush. During this deployment two Bushmasters were killed (SSG Charles R Browning and PFC Mykel F Miller, B Co, 1/158th Infantry) and others wounded during combat operations. 1/158th returned to the United States in March 2008.

In July 2018, 1st Battalion, 158th Infantry Regiment was mobilized and deployed to Afghanistan in support of Operation Freedom's Sentinel (OFS) with all companies as well as Easy DET. and Fox DET. The Battalion returned home to Arizona in May 2019, with many soldiers volunteering to return on orders less than a month later in support of the South West Border Mission.

Operationally the 158th Infantry Regiment falls under the authority of the 29th Infantry Brigade Combat Team. Although the 29th's headquarters is located in Hawaii, the 29th is one of 15 enhanced readiness brigades, with a training requirement to remain capable of being called up and deployed in less than 90 days.

Campaign streamers

Campaign credit

Decorations

Distinctive unit insignia
 Description
A gold color metal and enamel device 1 5/32 inches (2.94 cm) in height overall consisting of a blue shield charged with a Gila monster bendwise, head to base.  Attached below the shield is a blue scroll inscribed "CUIDADO" in gold.
 Symbolism
The service of the former and current organization, the 158th Infantry Regiment is indicated by the Gila monster, indigenous to the State of Arizona, which is emblematic of tenacity and security.  The color blue represents Infantry.  It is also symbolic of loyalty and faith.  The motto "CUIDADO" a Spanish word meaning "Take Care" is a caution first used by those serving in the regiment's progenitor, the 1st Arizona Volunteer Infantry.
 Background
The distinctive unit insignia was originally approved for the 158th Infantry Regiment, Arizona National Guard on 22 July 1924.  It was amended to authorize its wear in pairs on 11 April 1926. It was redesignated for the 158th Regiment, Arizona Army National Guard with description and symbolism revised on 7 May 1998.  The insignia was redesignated for the 158th Infantry Regiment, Arizona Army National Guard with symbolism revised on 22 November 2005.

The Gila monster (Heloderma suspectum, /ˈhiːlə/ HEE-lə) is a species of venomous lizard native to the southwestern United States and northwestern Mexican state of Sonora. The Gila monster is the only venomous lizard native to the United States, and like the 1st Volunteers they are a native to the land and unique in its commitment and deadly beyond any of its kind. The fight brought to the Apache menace was that of native peoples banded together by leaders like CPT John D. Walker. By comparison, the Heloderma suspectum, the volunteers were slow in sprinting ability (due to improper funding, living quarters and rations), but they proved to have high endurance and maximal kill capability once they found their prey (the Apache). It is widely known that once the a Gila Monster grips its prey it will never release it until it is fully incapacitated.  The Apache Wars continue to be the longest war in Americas history of conflicts and war.

Later a chief of the Pima Indians, Captain John D. Walker of the Arizona 1st Volunteer Infantry, was a company commander (1st Inf., A. V.). During his duty in Apacheria, CPT Walker wrote a dissertation to the Smithsonian Institution on its claim that the Arizona Gila Monster was not poisonous. He contended that it was, and sent it and a specimens to them for analysis. They reversed their decision and admitted that it was poisonous. This is the Genesis of the symbolism.

Coat of arms
 Blazon
 Shield – Argent on a saltire Gules two arrows crossed of the field, in dexter fess a prickly pear cactus Vert and in sinister fess a fleur-de-lis Azure.
 Crest – That for regiments and separate battalions of the Arizona Army National Guard:  From a wreath Argent and Gules, a giant cactus Proper.
 Motto –   CUIDADO (Take Care).
 Symbolism
 Shield – The service of the former and current organization, the 158th Infantry Regiment, is indicated by the white shield, which represents Infantry.  The red saltire cross recalls the fact that the regiment was organized in 1865, under an order from the Provost Marshal General of the United States, and under authority granted for the raising of troops for the Civil War.  The arrows indicate the regiment's early service in fighting the Apache Indians.  The motto has two meanings or rather two applications – a warning to those who might oppose the Regiment and a caution to those who belong to it.
 Crest – The crest is that of the Arizona Army National Guard.
 Background – The coat of arms was originally approved for the 158th Infantry Regiment, Arizona Army National Guard on 26 July 1924.  It was redesignated for the 1581st Military Police Battalion, Arizona Army National Guard on 14 August 1969.  It was redesignated for the 158th Military Police Battalion, Arizona Army National Guard on 26 September 1969.  It was redesignated for the 158th Regiment, Arizona Army National Guard on 29 April 1998.  The insignia was redesignated for the 158th Infantry Regiment, Arizona Army National Guard with symbolism revised on 22 November 2005.

References

 Bushmasters History
 Andrew Edward Masich (2006). The Civil War in Arizona: the story of the California Volunteers, 1861–1865. University of Oklahoma Press. . pp. 38–39.
 A history of the First Arizona Volunteer Infantry, 1865–1866 by Lonnie Edward Underhill, The University of Arizona 1979 
 History of Arizona by Thomas Edwin Farish, Arizona Historian. Volume IV Chapters 5,7 and 8. Phoenix, Arizona, 1916.

External links
 Suggested Reading on the 158th Infantry compiled by the United States Army Center of Military History

Military units and formations in Arizona
Infantry regiments of the United States Army
Military units and formations established in 1941
Infantry regiments of the United States Army in World War II
Infantry regiments of the United States Army National Guard